Lost Years is a 1911 silent film dramatic short directed by Richard Foster Baker and starring Francis X. Bushman. It was produced by the Essanay Studios and released by the General Film Company.

Cast
Francis X. Bushman - James Brown

See also
Francis X. Bushman filmography

References

External links
 Lost Years at IMDb.com

1911 films
Essanay Studios films
1911 short films
American silent short films
American black-and-white films
Silent American drama films
1911 drama films
1910s American films